Yuvraj Chaudhary (born 6 October 2001) is an Indian cricketer. He made his Twenty20 debut on 9 November 2021, for Chandigarh in the 2021–22 Syed Mushtaq Ali Trophy. He made his List A debut on 8 December 2021, for Chandigarh in the 2021–22 Vijay Hazare Trophy.

References

External links
 

2001 births
Living people
Indian cricketers
Chandigarh cricketers
Place of birth missing (living people)